Aksu is a municipality and district governorate in Greater Antalya, Turkey. Antalya is one of the 30 metropolitan centers in Turkey with more than one municipality within city borders. In Antalya there are five second-level municipalities in addition to Greater Antalya (büyükşehir) municipality.

Geography 
It is almost merged to Antalya, the province center and in fact it is included in Greater Antalya. Antalya Airport is within Aksu district. The population of Aksu was 47023 as of 2012.

History 
The area around Aksu was a part of Pamphylia of the antiquity. Ancient city of Perga is within Aksu district. Later the area around Aksu became a part of Roman Empire, Byzantine Empire, Anatolian beyliks, and the  Ottoman Empire. During the Turkish republic era, there were five nearby villages Aksu and Çalkaya being the most important ones. Between 1977 and 1994 these villages were declared townships and finally in 1999 they were merged to form the district of Aksu.

Economy 
Main economic activity of Aksu is intensive agriculture. Various vegetables and fruits are produced.   The industry of Aksu is mostly based on agriculture. Tourism also plays a role in district economy. Perga and Kurşunlu Waterfall are important visitor attractions.

The rural area of the district 
There are 13 villages and one town in the rural area of the district. The total population of the district is 65303.

External links 
 Lara Beach

References

Populated places in Antalya Province